The Widnes Vikings competed in the Co-operative Championship in 2010. Widnes were the defending 2010 National League Cup champions after they won the competition in 2009.

Off Field Activity

2010 Strip

The Widnes Vikings unveiled their new 2010 home shirt on Tuesday 1 December 2009 in front of 300 fans at the Stobart Stadium Halton.

Manufactured by Irish-based O'Neill's Sportswear, the shirt was specially designed with advances moisture control allowing the body to breathe easily with the garment feeling dry and cool to contribute to improved player performance.

The main shirt sponsor was the Stobart Group, and the word 'Stobart' was written across the front of the shirt. The strip also had four coloured lines (1 black, 2 red and another black line) stretching up the left hand side of the shirt; these four lines were similar to the three red lines the Stobart Group use on their haulage vehicles.

The shirt also featured the RFL's 'Try Assist' logo, the new name for the RFL Benevolent Fund and a new sleeve sponsor for 2010 in Halton Housing Trust. The logo of Halton Borough Council was also displayed on the right hand side of the chest on the front of the shirt.

During the event the 2010 squad numbers were announced and fans were able to pre-order the new shirt which the Vikings will wear against Warrington Wolves in the World of Beds Cup on Boxing Day.

For the Gateshead Thunder game in 2009, chairman Steve O'Connor offered free admission for all Vikings fans. As season ticket holders did not benefit from this special offer (as they had already paid for the game when purchasing their season ticket), the club decided they would give vouchers to the 2009 season ticket holders who renewed their season tickets during an 'Early Bird' promotion. The vouchers were for fans to use on kit manufacturer O'Neills merchandise in the January sales.

Fans could claim discounts on Vikings items from the store, including the new 2010 strip. The discounts were: adult season ticket holders £10, concession season ticket holders £7 and junior season ticket holders £2. These discounts could only be applied when visiting the O'Neils store in Widnes town centre.

Vikings' CEO Alex Bonney explained the thinking behind the initiative: "Steve's offer in June came when things weren't going well on the pitch and the comeback against Gateshead, plus the atmosphere generated by our fans, set the team up for the victory over Halifax in the NRC semi-final and ultimately the final victory over Barrow to give us the ability to apply for a 2012 Super League licence.
"While recognising that season ticket holders had already paid for this game as part of their 2009 ticket, we had planned to discount their 2010 season ticket but were heartened that a number of fans spoke to us to say that they understood the 'bigger picture' and were keen to back the club's initiative for that game without recompense.
"With that in mind, and in conjunction with O'Neill's, the voucher scheme was established.
"However, for those fans who do not wish to avail of this offer, we will class their voucher as a donation to the Valhalla Foundation, our award-winning charity.""

Special Edition Charity Kit
On Thursday 18 March Widnes wore a specially designed "one-off" charity kit during their Co-Operative Championship match, that was broadcast live on Sky Sports against Halifax to promote the Everyman Campaign, which raises awareness of testicular and prostate cancer in men.

The specially designed kit was manufactured by the Vikings current kit manufacturer O'Neils. The design of the kit was featured around a "nude" look, with the shirt made to look like a bare chested male torso, and the shorts made to look like males thighs, with a fig leaf covering the genital area.

Fans could purchase the special edition shirt from Wednesday 10 March. The shirt cost £40 and in aid of event O'Neil's donated £5 from every shirt sale to the Everyman charity. Fans were also able to make a donation online through a special page set up by the Vikings on the Justgiving website. Fans were also able to donate on the night at the Stobart Stadium Halton as volunteers were available within the stadium to collect donations.

To raise further funds for the charity, fans were able to purchase the match shirts worn by the players on the night through an auction run by the club. Fans were given until 5.00 pm on Monday 22 March to submit a bid to the club. Bids opened up at a minimum price of £50.00 and bids could be submitted by e-mail or by leaving a bid in a sealed envelope at the club reception.

Vikings chairman Steve O'Connor said: "Nearly everyone knows someone who has been affected by cancer. Unfortunately among men it is still a problem we don't like to talk about. We want to help raise awareness of the symptoms - and how to get help - and also help to raise money for such an important cause. We have chosen the Halifax game because we are expecting a big crowd so we can make a significant donation to Everyman".

Everyman spokesperson Tatjana Trposka said: "We are thrilled with the support we have received from Widnes Vikings. We desperately need to raise more awareness and funds to fight prostate and testicular cancers and we are another step closer thanks to the help of Widnes."

Transfers & Squad

It was all change for Widnes during pre-season with eight popular first team players leaving the Stobart Stadium Halton for pastures new. Gavin Dodd, John Duffy, Richard Fletcher, Tim Hartley, Michael Ostick and Brett Robinson all left in transfer deals, whilst Danny Mills and Lee Paterson were released.

Many of the moves were forced due to RFL reducing the salary cap. Previously the Championship's salary cap operated by limiting a club's player costs to no more than 50% of the club's income and is capped at a limit of £400,000. The new figures for 2010 will be reduced to 40% and £300,000, respectively.

Sporting Director Terry O'Connor said: "I know some of the players leaving would prefer to stay and we would like to keep them but with the reduction of the salary cap to £300,000, we have to spend accordingly".

Transfers In

Loan/Dual Registration

Under new rulings Super League players are eligible for dual registration with a Championship club. The dual registration system is different to a loan agreement. Dual registered players can be called back at any time by their original club, when needed to play for them intermittently based upon form or injuries. When they are not needed by their original club they are eligible to play for their alternative dual registered club.

A player is only eligible for dual registration if they are outside the top 20 players (financially) of the Super League club's playing squad. Dual registered players are not allowed to feature in Challenge Cup games for their alternative club.

Loan players may go to Championship Clubs or to Super League clubs but must go for a minimum of 4 weeks.

Transfers Out

Current squad

Pre season
The international rugby league season took place between the 2009 and 2010 seasons, with the Four Nations being held in England and France. Vikings assistant coach Stuart Wilkinson assisted former Widnes star Bobbie Goulding by leading the French national team into the Four Nations, against England, Australia and New Zealand.

France's opening game was against England in the Keepmoat Stadium in Doncaster. Wilkinson and Goulding's French team started off strong taking a 12-4 lead at half time. England put in a strong second half performance scoring 30 unanswered point to win the game 34-12. Results didn't get much better for the French side as they were punished 62-12 by New Zealand in their second game of the competition and defeated 42-4 by Australia in their final game.

Despite losing all three games Wilkinson believes the experience will prove invaluable to him as a coach as he gained valuable insights on some new training and tactical ideas he plans to introduce to the training pitch at Widnes. He said: "It's great working with and against the game's elite and pitting your wits against the best players and coaches in the world. Since returning I've already discussed tactics with Paul at length and we'll see what we can do."

Fixtures and results

Round 1: vs. Warrington

Widnes Vikings are hoping to open up their pre-season schedule with a win over Super League neighbours and fierce rivals Warrington Wolves, in the World of Beds Cup on Boxing Day. This will also be the first time the fans get the chance to see some of the Vikings new signings in action.

It will be the first time former Wolves player Steve Pickersgill faces up against his old club after his transfer to the Vikings during the off season. Vikings Head Coach Paul Cullen also a former Warrington Wolves player stated that the tie is not about "me versus Warrington", it's about getting a good run-out for some of our players and raising some funds.

However, freezing weather conditions led to the game being cancelled as the surface was unplayable, and road conditions treacherous for fans. The game was rescheduled for Sunday, 3 January but again the severe weather conditions resulted in the game being cancelled a second time.

Round 2: vs. Blackpool
Widnes Vikings assistant coach Stuart Wilkinson and conditioning coach Mick Cassidy continued their pre-season preparations by getting the Widnes side ready for a seaside clash with Blackpool Panthers in the absence of head coach Paul Cullen who was granted compassionate leave by the club whilst his wife is receiving treatment for  cancer.

The snow and ice has meant the temporary duo of Wilkinson and Cassidy have had the unenviable task of finding alternative methods of preparing the squad for the Blackpool fixture. Wilkinson is happy to do all he can to help out during a difficult time for the club, he said: "I love the coaching work that I do and I have no aspiration to be a head coach, but it's a case of needs must at the moment. We're working in an unusual circumstances and Paul will be in and out. We're all supporting Paul in the best way we can and so myself and Mick Cassidy will ensure everything runs like he wants it to."

Despite all the effort put in on both sides to prepare for the fixture, the freezing weather conditions have again interrupted the Viking's pre season schedule. Due to snow and ice the pitch has been deemed unplayable and the Blackpool Panthers vs Widnes Vikings game was cancelled.

Round 3: vs. St Helens
2,034 fans braved the bitterly cold weather as the Widnes Vikings suffered a 42-26 defeat at the hands of Super League giants St. Helens in the Karalius Cup. This is the second time the sides have met in the Karalius Cup which was set up in honour of Vince Karalius who was a well decorated player for both Widnes and St Helens  in the 1950s, and 1960s. Vince died from cancer in 2008.

This was the first run out the players had had in the 2010 campaign after the Vikings pre-season preparations were hampered by severe weather conditions, dubbed the  Big Freeze by the media. Severe snowfall had resulted in unplayable conditions with caused both the Warrington Wolves and Blackpool Panthers games to be cancelled. For many of the Vikings players this was the first time they had played in months and was a chance to try to cement their place in the starting line up for the upcoming Co-operative Championship season.

Saint's arrived at the Stobart Stadium with plenty of players who are expecting to see first team action in this year's Super League campaign, with Saints imposing an early 22 point lead after four unanswered tries from Gary Wheeler, Jamie Foster, Sia Soliola and Bryn Hargreaves and 3 conversions from Jamie Foster.

Widnes who chose to wear their new 2010 away strip for the clash soon broke through the St Helens defence with two tries from Dean Thompson who was thrust into the starting line up after Toa Kohe-Love pulled a ham string during the pre-game warm up. Shane Grady followed up with successful conversions to add the extras to make it 22-12.

Tom Armstrong increased the St Helens lead before a superb 80 metre inter-passing run between Anthony Thackeray and Danny Hulme with Thackeray going in for the points to score the final try of the half.

The Vikings were first off the mark in the second half with a try from Matt Strong who went in over the line from close range as he made the most of his opportunity following a fumble on possession from the Saints.

Saints followed up with tries from Gary Wheeler and dual registered Chris Dean.

The Saints lead was quickly closed as Matt Gardner went in for another Widnes try, but this was too little too late as the Saints held out a 10-point lead before Jamie Ellis finished off the Vikings with another St Helens try.

After the game Saints Head coach Mick Potter was full of admiration for the Vikings. He said: "I think Widnes have got some real players in there who can really make a impact on the Championship next season. From what I seen out there James Webster could still play Super League and with Mark Smith leading them around the park they have a leader. The forwards are pretty solid too, so I think Widnes look in decent shape ahead of the season."

Vikings Head coach Paul Cullen was also impressed with the Vikings performance. He said:  "I was very happy with what I saw out there. The main thing was the players got some quality game time and got out on the pitch. The likes of Dean Thompson has come in for Toa Kohe-Love on the last minute and he has gone over for two tries and he took them well. Shane Grady has also done well."

Round 4: vs. Carcassonne
To celebrate the 70th anniversary of the French club, Carcassonne and Widnes organised this pre-season friendly in France. The match against Carcassonne, the club with best historical record in France, was well attended with more than 800 spectators.

The Vikings had a pre-season friendly lined up against Salford City Reds the following day, taking this into account Widnes sent a combination of players from the academy and the reserve side with players ranging from sixteen to twenty one years of age.

This was the first time that the vast majority of the young squad had experienced open age rugby against a Carcassonne consisting seasoned professionals. Two minutes in Widnes lost full back Dave Kennedy, one of our more experienced players, through injury. Kennedy was replaced by Dave Dourley. The young Vikings side stood up well against a vastly more experienced team who were match fit being in the middle of their season. After 8 minutes a towering kick from Danny Craven was pounced on by Mark Briodie to score the opening try of the match, with Craven converting for the extra points.

The Carcassonne forwards were not making much progress but had a good kicking game. Widnes gave away a few penalties early on but were otherwise faultless in defence. A 40-20 by Dave Dourley set up a scrum out on the right and from the scrum good work by Gregg Scott and Tom Rigby sent Chris Moogan over after 23 mins.

The Vikings were penalised for a knock on shortly after the kick off and Carcassonne made the most of the opportunity and after good work from Andreas Bauer went over wide right on 27 mins. Substitutions were coming thick and fast and the French side's half backs came into fruition. A good handling move resulted in a try under the posts after 32 mins. Carcassonne converted making it 10 – 10 at the halftime interval.

The first set of the second half resulted in a try for Adam Lawton but the conversion was missed by Craven. Carcassonne began to make the most of their possession and on 47 mins juggled the ball over the line to score out wide on the left but failed to make the conversion.

The Vikings were penalised for another knock on, which gave Carcassonne the ball close to the Widnes line. Carcassonne again made the most of the opportunity and scored in the corner. This was followed up by a successful  conversion to lead 20 - 14.

Widnes' lack of match fitness was beginning to show, the Vikings made a few breaks but could not capitalise. Carcassonne kept the ball alive on their possession and their prop crashed over for another try and kicked the conversion to take the lead 26 - 14.

Widnes had chances but were giving up possession too easily. The scoring was completed after 67 mins when another good passing move resulted in a Carcassonne try. The conversion was successful give Carcassonne a 32 - 14 lead which they held onto until the end of the match.

Round 5: vs. Salford
Widnes suffered another setback in the pre-season preparations after losing 36-0 to Salford City Reds at the Stobart Stadium Halton. Salford fielded their strongest possible side for the friendly match in preparation for the upcoming Super League season. Amongst the Salford line-up were three former Vikings players Karl Fitzpatrick, Stephen Tyrer and Adam Sidlow, who scored five tries between them.

This is the second time in a week that the Vikings have faced a Super League side after they were defeated last Tuesday (19 January 2010) by St. Helens. Widnes were missing seven senior first team players from the starting line-up, and the younger, inexperienced Vikings side could not cope with the pressure from the Super League side.

Widnes had a few moments early on but a tight Salford defence was able to shut them out. The game lacked any real excitement and was very much a stop start affair, with referee James Child taking centre stage after interrupting the game 27 times for penalties. The referee was also the centre of a controversial decision when he dismissed Tommy Coyle and Karl Fitzpatrick after Fitzpatrick struck  Coyle after the hooker had delivered a loose high tackle which Widnes Head Coach Paul Cullen said wasn't a sending off offence. Fitzpatrick was then involved in a further incident when he threw his sports drink into a section of Widnes supporters before heading down the tunnel to the dressing room. As a result of the red card Fitzpatrick could miss the start of the Super League season through suspension.

Salford put points on the board early on after Fitzpatrick went over the line after only two minutes of play and again a few moments later for his second. Salford continued the scoring with tries from Steve Tyrer and Ashley Gibson. Salford took a sixteen-point lead into the break and added another twenty points in the second half with tries from Steve Tyrer, Adam Sidlow, Jodie Broughton and Luke Adamson. Stefan Ratchford added the extra points with two successful conversions.

Vikings head coach Paul Cullen can take some comfort in knowing that this is a new squad and he won't be facing Super League opposition week in week out this season, he said: We won't be playing that calibre of opposition every week. Today was all about using this match to try to toughen ourselves up and if that's all we've got out of it, so be it. Salford were very good and you have to take into account the opposition here and that they are in Super League. We had a number of key players missing, but it's a trial game and the real work starts next week.

Karl Fitzpatrick issued a public apology the following day to the Widnes supports for his conduct as he left the field after his red card. Fitzpatrick offered to personally meet and apologise to any Vikings supporters that were affected by his actions. Director of Football for Salford Steve Simms said: "Karl was shook up by our version of events and he has no recollection of any of it. The blow to the head has knocked the sense out of him. However, none of this condones what happened out there, for which Karl and the Club are deeply apologetic".

Regular season

Fixtures and results

National League Cup

The Widnes Vikings are competing in National League Cup, known as the Northern Rail Cup for sponsorship reasons.  This is a competition for clubs in the Co-operative Championship and Championship One. The exception to this is Toulouse Olympique, who do not participate in the cup at present.

Pool 1 Qualification Table

Challenge Cup

The 2010 Challenge Cup (officially known as the 2010 Carnegie Challenge Cup for sponsorship reasons) is a knockout rugby league tournament which began its preliminary stages in January.

The Challenge Cup is the most competitive European rugby league tournament at club level and is open to teams from England, Wales, Scotland, France and Russia.

The final of the Challenge Cup is one of the most prestigious matches in world rugby league, and is traditionally held at Wembley Stadium, London. Despite London not being an area traditionally associated with rugby league, the final receives a lot of mainstream media coverage and is broadcast to many different countries around the world.

Super League side Warrington Wolves are the reigning champions, following their 16–25 victory over Huddersfield Giants in the 2009 Challenge Cup Final at Wembley Stadium on 29 August 2009.

Widnes Vikings joined the 2010 Challenge Cup in the third round and were drawn against amateur side Wigan St Judes.

Championship

The Widnes Vikings are competing in the 2010 Co-operative Championship. The Co-Operative Championship is a semi-professional rugby league football competition played in the United Kingdom and France, one tier below the first tier Super League.

The two worst performing teams during the season, with the exception of Toulouse Olympique, will be relegated to Championship 1. There is no automatic promotion from this league to Super League, which uses a licensing system which renewed every three years. Qualifying for the grand final is a prerequisite for Championship clubs to be able to apply for license in the next round of applications for the 2012–14 period.

The 2010 Co-Operative Championship season will consist of two stages. The regular season is played over 22 round-robin fixtures, in which each of the eleven teams involved in the competition will play each other once at home and once away. In the 2010 Co-Operative Championship, a win is worth three points in the table, a draw is worth one two points apiece, and a loss by 12 points or fewer is worth 1 bonus point.

The league leaders at the end of the regular season will receive the league leaders trophy, but the Championship is decided through the second stage of the season via a playoffs system. The top six teams in the table will contest to play in the grand final, the winners of which are crowned 2010 Co-Operative Champions.

Table

Squad Statistics

References

Widnes Vikings seasons
Widnes Vikings
2010 in English rugby league